

Alfred was a medieval Bishop of Sherborne.

Alfred was consecrated between 932 and 934. He died between 939 and 943.

Citations

References

External links
 ; see also 

Bishops of Sherborne (ancient)
10th-century English bishops